The Luther seal or Luther rose is a widely recognized symbol for Lutheranism. It was the seal that was designed for Martin Luther at the behest of John Frederick of Saxony in 1530, while Luther was staying at the Coburg Fortress during the Diet of Augsburg. Lazarus Spengler, to whom Luther wrote his interpretation below, sent Luther a drawing of this seal. Luther saw it as a compendium or expression of his theology and faith, which he used to authorize his correspondence. Luther informed Philipp Melanchthon on 15 September 1530, that the Prince had personally visited him in the Coburg fortress and presented him with a signet ring, presumably displaying the seal.

Components of the seal connected to Luther earlier than 1530
A single rose had been known as Luther's emblem since 1520 when Wolfgang Stöckel in Leipzig published one of Luther’s sermons with a woodcut of the reformer. This was the first contemporary depiction of Martin Luther.

Luther's doctor's ring displayed a heartlike shield, the symbol of the Holy Trinity.

Luther's interpretation of his seal

In a 8 July 1530 letter to Lazarus Spengler, Luther interprets his seal:

Use in Byzantine Rite Lutheranism

Churches of Byzantine Rite Lutheranism, such as the Ukrainian Lutheran Church, use the Luther rose with an Orthodox cross in the centre.

Use in coats of arms
The Luther rose is used in many coats of arms. The assumption that Martin Luther had visited any of these places is not confirmed.

German and Austrian arms

See also 

 
 Rose (heraldry) – often used both as a charge  on a coat of arms and by itself as an heraldic badge
 Rose symbolism

Notes

Bibliography
 Luther, Martin. D. Martin Luthers Werke, Kritische Gesamtausgabe. Briefwechsel. 18 vols. Weimar: Verlag Hermann Böhlaus Nachfolger, 1930-85. (abbreviated as WABr above).
 Luther, Martin. Luther's Works. 55 Volumes. Various translators. St. Louis: Concordia Publishing House; Minneapolis: Fortress Press, 1957-1986. CD-ROM edition, 2001. (abbreviated as LW above).

Further reading

External links
 Lutheran Symbols and Crosses

Christian symbols
Lutheranism
Martin Luther
Heraldic charges
Seals (insignia)
Heart symbols